The Oklahoma Monarchs were a Negro league baseball team in the Western Independent Clubs in 1910 based in Oklahoma City, Oklahoma. They played their home games at Colcord Park.

The club featured future Baseball Hall of Famer Louis Santop along with Sam Bennett and Bingo DeMoss.

References

Negro league baseball teams
Baseball teams established in 1910
Baseball teams disestablished in 1910
1910 establishments in Oklahoma
1910 disestablishments in Oklahoma